Saint Mommolin of Noyon (or Mummolinus, Momelin, Mommolenus, Mommolinus, Mummolin; died ) was a monk who became an abbot in Saint-Omer, then Bishop of Noyon-Tournai in Belgium.
His feast day is 16 October.

Life

Mommolin was born on the shores of Lake Constance, and became a monk at Luxeuil Abbey in France.
He founded and was superior of the old abbey near Saint-Omer, then abbot of the new Sithin Abbey (later Abbey of Saint Bertin) in the same town, and then Bishop of Noyon-Tournai in Belgium.
He was a companion of Saint Bertin the Great. 
He died around 686.

Monks of Ramsgate account

The monks of St Augustine's Abbey, Ramsgate wrote in their Book of Saints (1921),

Baring-Gould's account

Sabine Baring-Gould (1834–1924) in his Lives Of The Saints under October 16 wrote,

Butler's account

The hagiographer Alban Butler (1710–1773) wrote in his Lives of the Fathers, Martyrs, and Other Principal Saints under October 16,

Notes

Sources

 
 

 

7th-century Frankish saints
686 deaths